Koprivshtitsa Municipality is a municipality in Sofia Province, Bulgaria. The only settlement and administrative center of the municipality is Koprivshtitsa.

Demography

Religion
According to the latest Bulgarian census of 2011, the religious composition, among those who answered the optional question on religious identification, was the following:

References

Municipalities in Sofia Province